西域番国志 (Pinyin: Xi Yu Fan Guo Zhi or Hsi-yü fan-kuo chih; literally "A Record of the Barbarian Countries in the Western Region.") was a report submitted by Ming dynasty envoy Chen Cheng (陈诚) to the Yongle Emperor about the eighteen countries and territories he traveled through during 1414-1415 as a member of an embassy contingency, to the kingdom of Timurid in Central Asia.

Contents
Xi Yu Fan Guo Zhi consists of 18 chapters:
Herat
Samarkand
Andkud
Balkh
Termez
Shahrokhia
Sayram
Tashkent
Bukhara
Kesh
Yanghikend
Bishbalik
Turpan
Ya Er
Yamshi
Khocho
Lukchun
Kumul

English translation
There is no complete translation of the  Xi Yu Fan Guo Zhi, however, there is an English translation of the first chapter:
Morris Rossabi: "A Translation of Ch'en Ch'eng's Hsi-Yü Fan-Kuo Chih", Ming Studies, 17 (1983): 49-59.

See also 
 Morris Rossabi, "Two Ming Envoys to Inner Asia," T'oung Pao, LXII/1-3 1976, 1-34.
 F. J. Hecker, "A fifteenth-century Chinese diplomat in Herat", Journal of the Royal Asiatic Society, 3rd series p85-91, 1993.
 Emil Bretschneider Mediaeval Researches vol 2, p 147.

Chinese classic texts
History of Herat Province
Ming dynasty
15th-century books